Palestina, Peru is a town in the district and province of Purús in the Ucayali Region of Peru, founded in 1994.

History 
Before 1994, Palestina was a set of fields where cattle and crops were raised and people lived in the fields. In 1994 the mayor of Purús Province came to the area to found a town and build homes for any farmers who wished to live there.

Economy
In addition to raising cattle, Palestina grows rice, corn, and fruits: pineapple, banana, coconut, cocona, orange, peach palm, passion fruit, and tangerine.

Holidays
The town celebrates some national holidays: Mother's Day, Father's Day, and Labor Day.  They celebrate local anniversaries of the town's founding and the church founding, and they celebrate harvest holidays: watermelon planting, caywa planting, watermelon harvest, and rice harvest.

Documentary

A documentary featuring Palestina, Peru, has been created under the title Web, in cooperation with the Wikimedia Foundation and A Human Right. It describes the impact of the One Laptop per Child program on Palestina, including showing the children in the school writing the initial version of the Spanish-language version of this Wikipedia page. A short segment from this documentary is available on YouTube.

References 

Populated places in the Ucayali Region
Populated places established in 1994
Articles containing video clips
1994 establishments in Peru